Bapudham Motihari Railway Station (previously Motihari Railway Station) is a major railway station in Motihari, East Champaran district of Bihar. Its station code is BMKI. The station mainly consists of six platforms and acts as the main station in the city of Motihari, which is being developed under azadi ka amrit mahostav programme and to celebrate 150 years of Mahatama Gandhi.

Connectivity 
There are total 113 trains available, which connect to some major cities of India viz., Amritsar, Bihar (Darbhanga, Katihar, Muzaffarpur, Narkatiaganj, Patliputra, Raxaul & Saharsa), Dehradun, Delhi (Anand Vihar), Guwahati, Gujarat (Ahmedabad & Porbandar), Howrah (Kolkata), Jaipur, Jammu, Mumbai (Bandra & LTT) and Uttar Pradesh (Bareilly, Kanpur, Lucknow & Manduadih).

Historical background 
It holds many historical references such as the start of the Champaran Satyagraha, in April 1917, on the request of Raj Kumar Shukla, for which Mahatma Gandhi went to Champaran and started the Satyagraha Movement against the cultivation of Neel (Indigo), in the Champaran district of Bihar, India, during the period of the British Raj. It was the first Satyagraha Movement, inspired by Mahatma Gandhi and a major revolt in the Indian independence movement. Jab Neel ka Daag Mita: Champaran 1917, by author Pushyamitra expresses such events about the plight, Bihar farmers faced and the fight towards freedom which Bapu lead.

Another important Satyagraha just after this revolt was Kheda Satyagraha of 1918, which was also here for the first time, Mahatma Gandhi was first addressed as Bapu & Mahatma.

Due to these movements, the station name changed from Motihari railway station to Bapudham Motihari railway station (Bapudham: Land of Bapu), as a special tribute, for the contribution towards independence of India by the Father of the Nation, Mahatma Gandhi.

Ranking 
As per Station Superintendent Rakesh Kumar Tripathi, it was ranked 264th in the year 2018. And was again ranked 23rd for the overall cleanliness, among the list of the top 100 stations, including the new stations of East-Central Railway, in October 2019. Rajesh Kumar, Chief Public Relations Officer of East Central Railway Hajipur, said that it has ranked 9th among the top 10 stations, which have improved rapidly in the whole country.

It has also been included in the list of top 25 railway stations in the India, released by Railway Minister Piyush Goyal, for the ranking of clean and green stations in New Delhi, to mark the 150th birth anniversary of Mahatma Gandhi.

References 

Motihari
Motihari